The 1984 National Panasonic Open was a women's tennis tournament played on outdoor grass courts in Brisbane, Australia that was part of the Category 1 tier of the 1984 Virginia Slims World Championship Series. It was the fifth edition of the tournament and was held from 19 through 25 November 1984. Third-seeded Helena Suková won the singles title.

Finals

Singles
 Helena Suková defeated  Elizabeth Smylie 6–4, 6–4
 It was Suková's 1st singles title of the year and the 2nd of her career.

Doubles
 Martina Navratilova /  Pam Shriver defeated  Bettina Bunge /  Eva Pfaff 6–3, 6–2
 It was Navratilova's 23rd title of the year and the 202nd of her career. It was Shriver's 13th title of the year and the 62nd of her career.

References

External links
 ITF tournament edition details
 Tournament draws

National Panasonic Open
National Panasonic Open
National Panasonic Open
National Panasonic Open
National Panasonic Open, 1984